The 2022 BFF President's Cup was the first edition of the Bhutan Football Federation's President's Cup, hosted in Gyalpozhing, Mongar. Teams competed in a league-cum-knockout format. The first match was played on January 5.

Transport United won the tournament by defeating Thimphu City in the final on penalties.

Group A
 Paro
 Ugyen Academy
 Druk Lhayul
 Youngster

Group B
 Transport United
 Thimphu City
 Tensung (withdrew)
 Sherubtse

Knockout stage
Druk Lhayul
Paro
Thimphu City
Transport United

See also
Football in Bhutan
Bhutan Premier League
Bhutan national football team
Jigme Dorji Wangchuk Memorial Gold Cup

References

Football competitions in Bhutan
2022 Asian domestic association football cups